Kenichi Fujita (born 14 April 1975) is a Japanese gymnast. He finished in 25th place in the all around at the 2000 Summer Olympics.

References

External links
 

1975 births
Living people
Japanese male artistic gymnasts
Olympic gymnasts of Japan
Gymnasts at the 2000 Summer Olympics
Sportspeople from Osaka